The bluespine unicornfish  or short-nose unicornfish (Naso unicornis) is a tang from the Indo-Pacific. It occasionally makes its way into the aquarium trade. It grows to a size of 70 cm in length. It is called kala (meaning "thorn") in Hawaii, dawa in New Caledonia, and ta or tā in Fiji.

Description 
The bluespine unicornfish has a blueish-gray body with two blue spines on each side at the base of the tail and a short rostrum or bony horn on the forehead. In small fish the horn is missing and males additionally have tail streamers. These fish have a leather like skin instead of scales. The Bluespine Unicorn fish can grow up to 27 inches with the largest one caught to be 12.7 lbs.

Distribution 
The bluespine unicornfish is very common in the tropical Indo-Pacific region usually occurring at temperatures between 77 and 85 F.

Habitat 
The bluespine unicornfish are a near shore fish. The juvenile tend to stay close to shore while the adults tend to live from shallow to the beginnings of the deep water staying within the upper 40 feet. They tend to enjoy spots with waves or strong surges. The bluespine unicornfish live often solitary on coral reefs or can be found in small schools of unicorn fish or as a part of larger schools with many other fish species.

Diet 
Bluespine unicornfish are herbivores and feed on brown and red algae with coarse or leafy blades.

Human Use & Cultural Significance 
Bluespine unicornfish are eaten in abundance due to how common they are. They have a strong flavor and odor due to their diet. When skinned, the meat is white with a slight pink-red taint and a firm or moist texture. Bluespine unicornfish are usually eaten raw, boiled, grilled, baked or sauteed.

The Bluespine unicornfish or the Kala was an important food source in old Hawaii. The tough skin of kala was sometimes stretched over a half coconut shell to make a small knee drum. The Hawaiians also used Kala in ceremonies between members of a tribe or between tribes.  Today kala is still a common food source to the people of Hawaii and other Pacific Islands.

References

External links
 

Naso (fish)
Fish of Hawaii
Fish of the Pacific Ocean
Fish of the Indian Ocean
Fish of Palau
Fish described in 1775